Hermann Rosa (* November 2, 1911, Pirna; † October 5, 1981, Munich) was a German sculptor and architect.

Biography 

Born as the son of a stonemason Hermann Rosa in Pirna, he grew up with six siblings on the castle Oberpolitz. He visited a Stone Mason's College in Saubsdorf (today Supíkovice). During the years of 1934 - 1938 he was a disciple of Professor Drahonovsky at the Art College in Prague. After this he became a student of Professor Karl Albiker at the Dresden Academy of Art in the years of 1939 - 1946 (although there were several interruptions in between).

Works 

 1937  Pferdegruppe composition
 1947  Wassertägerin (bronze)
 1948/49  Eva, portrait (bronze)
 1949  Eva, act (bronze)
 1950  Flucht (Flight), relief (bronze)
 1951  Sinnende (bronze)
 1952  Liebespaar (Lovers) (bronze)
 1952  Stürzender Engel (bronze)
 1952  Auferstehung (Resurrection), Relief (bronze)
 1953  Sitzende (bronze)
 1953  Stehende mit Ast (bronze)
 1953/54 Adalbert Stifter, portrait after death mask (bronze)
 1954 Eva, abstract (bronze)
 1954 Schmerzensmann (bronze)
 1954 Adalbert Stifter, bust, memorial in Fürth (Bavaria) (bronze)
 1955 Käfer (Beetle), after Franz Kafka (bronze)
 1955/56 Flüchtlinge, relief two-parts (bronze)
 1970 - 1981 Ludwig Spegel, portrait (bronze)
 1972 - 1981 Self-portrait (bronze)
 1977 - 1981 Blitz, fountain Augsburg- Hochzoll (bronze)

His studios 

 1954 - 1959 Studio Wallnerstreet 9, Munich-Freimann
 1954 - 1959 Studio Wallnerstreet 12, Munich-Freimann
 1960 - 1968 Studio Osterwaldstreet, Munich-Schwabing

External links
Atelier ROSA Osterwaldstrasse 89 - Englischer garden in Munich

1911 births
1981 deaths
German sculptors
German male sculptors
20th-century sculptors